The Indy Crash was a women's full contact football team of the Women's Football Alliance based in Indianapolis, Indiana. Home games were played at Roncalli High School.

Season-by-season

|-
|2011 || 6 || 2 || 0 || 1st National North Central 1 || Won National Conference Quarterfinal (Atlanta)Won National Conference Semifinal (Jacksonville)Lost National Conference Championship (Boston)
|-
|2012 || 5 || 3 || 0 || 2nd National 4 || Won Division WildcardLost Division Championship (Chicago)
|-
|2013 || 2 || 6 || 0 ||  || 
|-
|2014 || 5 || 4 || 0 || 2nd Great Lakes Division || Lost to (Cleveland) 38–32
|-
|2015* || 3 || 2 || 0 ||  ||
|-
!Totals || 21 || 17 || 0 ||
|colspan="2"| (including playoffs)

* = current standing

2014

2012

2011

External links 

Women's Football Alliance teams
Crash
American football teams in Indiana
American football teams established in 2011
2011 establishments in Indiana